Buck Owens Crystal Palace (also known as the Crystal Palace and The Palace) is a music hall located in Bakersfield, California. It was constructed by Buck Owens, and was opened in 1996. Primarily it is a performance venue for country western music, although other music genres have been heard there. It is also the home of the Buck Owens Museum, which contains items related to his career (some of the items are also available for viewing online). Although it is classified in this article as a music hall, it is also a nightclub, bar, restaurant, and museum.

The Crystal Palace is designed in the Western Revival style, a style that resembles buildings from the 19th-century American Old West. The interior resembles an American western town from that same period. The museum is located in display cases around the first floor, which resemble the windows to the building.

History
The idea for the Buck Owens Crystal Palace originated in the mid-1980s. Buck spent most of his early career performing in small, smoke-filled bars and “honky-tonks” around the country. He wanted a high-class place for country-western music to be performed. Buck also wanted a place where he could be himself.

Construction started in the mid-1990s. Buck was closely involved with the project. He approved 135 change orders, several costing over $100,000. He also did not visualize from plans as well as seeing the actual construction. According to Jim Shaw (Buck Owens's right-hand man), on some occasions, he would see something constructed, and have it reconstructed larger and moved to a different location.

The cost of the project would eventually reach $7.4 million. Also, the large number of change orders would delay the opening over a year. The Crystal Palace was opened in 1996, and shortly became a Bakersfield landmark.

See also 
 List of music museums

References

External links
Buck Owens Crystal Palace

Buildings and structures in Bakersfield, California
Landmarks in Bakersfield, California
Theatres in California
Tourist attractions in Bakersfield, California
Museums in Kern County, California
Owens, Buck
Music museums in California
Music venues completed in 1996
Theatres completed in 1996